Diego Schwartzman defeated Francisco Cerúndolo in the final, 6–1, 6–2 to win the men's singles tennis title at the 2021 Argentina Open.

Casper Ruud was the defending champion but chose not to participate.

Seeds
The top four seeds receive a bye into the second round.

Draw

Finals

Top half

Bottom half

Qualifying

Seeds

Qualifiers

Qualifying draw

First qualifier

Second qualifier

Third qualifier

Fourth qualifier

References

External links
Main draw
Qualifying draw

2021 ATP Tour
2021 Singles
2021 in Argentine tennis